N-acylneuraminate cytidylyltransferase is an enzyme that in humans is encoded by the CMAS gene.

Function 

The enzyme encoded by this gene catalyzes the activation of Neu5Ac to Cytidine 5-prime-monophosphate N-acetylneuraminic acid (CMP-Neu5Ac), which provides the substrate required for the addition of sialic acid. Sialic acids of cell surface glycoproteins and glycolipids play a pivotal role in the structure and function of animal tissues. The pattern of cell surface sialylation is highly regulated during embryonic development, and changes with stages of differentiation. Studies of a similar murine protein suggest that this protein localizes to the nucleus.

References

External links

Further reading 

 
 
 
 
 
 
 
 

Enzymes